Bernardino Piccoli (1581–1636) was a Roman Catholic prelate who served as Bishop of Strongoli (1627–1636)
and Titular Archbishop of Nicaea (1622–1627).

Biography
Bernardino Piccoli was born in Umbriatico, Italy in 1581.
On 15 December 1621, he was appointed during the papacy of Pope Urban VIII as Titular Archbishop of Nicaea and Coadjutor Bishop of Strongoli.
On 2 January 1622, he was consecrated bishop by Fabrizio Verallo, Cardinal-Priest of Sant'Agostino, with Muzio Cinquini, Bishop of Avellino e Frigento, and Girolamo Ricciulli, Bishop of Belcastro, serving as co-consecrators. 
On 2 October 1627, he succeeded to the bishopric of Strongoli.
He served as Bishop of Strongoli until his death in 1636.

References

External links and additional sources
 (for Chronology of Bishops) 
 (for Chronology of Bishops)  
 (for Chronology of Bishops) 
 (for Chronology of Bishops) 

17th-century Italian Roman Catholic titular archbishops
Bishops appointed by Pope Urban VIII
1581 births
1636 deaths
17th-century Roman Catholic bishops in the Kingdom of Naples